Yuvalı is a village in the Kurtalan District of Siirt Province in Turkey. The village had a population of 110 in 2021.

The hamlets of Bozdoğan and Söğütlü are attached to Yuvalı. Söğütlü is populated by the Erebiyan tribe.

References 

Kurdish settlements in Siirt Province
Villages in Kurtalan District